The 2022–23 season is the Bashundhara Kings's 10th competitive professional season since its creation in 2013, and 5th consecutive season in Bangladesh Premier League, country's top tier football league. In addition to domestic league, Bashundhara Kings will participate on this season's edition of AFC Champions League, Federation Cup, Super Cup and Independence Cup. This season are covering period from 8 October to TBC 2023.

Players

Pre-season friendly

Transfer

In

Out

Competitions

Overall

Overview

Premier League

League table

Results summary

Results by round

Matches

Federation Cup

Group stage

Independence Cup

Group stage

Knockout stages

Super Cup

Group stages

AFC Champions League

Qualifying play-off

Statistics

Goalscorers

Source: Matches

References

Bashundhara Kings
Bangladeshi football club records and statistics
Football clubs in Bangladesh
2022 in Bangladeshi football
2023 in Bangladeshi football